Tiago Fernandes dos Santos e Sousa (born 20 November 1990), also known as Tiago Fernandes, is a Brazilian footballer who plays as a midfielder.

Youth
Tiago Fernandes grow up in Belo Horizonte and was a  promise star for the top rankings of Cruzeiro youth program before joining the Netherlands top team PSV Eindhoven in 2007.

Career
On 27 November 2006, days after completing his 16th birthday, Tiago Fernandes signed his first professional contract with Cruzeiro. After spending the 2006 and 2007 season with Cruzeiro, Tiago Fernandes made a move to Europe and stayed one year and six months with PSV Eindhoven in the Netherlands.

On February 2008, under the command of Caco Espinoza Tiago played one season with Centro de Futebol Zico Sociedade Esportiva in Brazil.

In 2010 Tiago made a move back to Europe and signed for CD Alcoyano in the Spanish second division before transferring to Oberliga club FC 08 Villingen in 2012.

In December 2013 Tiago Fernandes trialled with San Fernando CD of the Segunda División B.

Personal life
Tiago Fernandes was feature in the magazine Capricho in 2009.

References

Living people
1990 births
Footballers from Belo Horizonte
Brazilian footballers
Association football midfielders
PSV Eindhoven players
Miami Dade FC players
People from Cruzeiro, São Paulo
Expatriate soccer players in the United States
Brazilian expatriate footballers
Brazilian people of German descent